Begenyash (Bägänäş) is a rural locality (a village) in Pervomaysky Selsoviet, Sterlitamaksky District, Bashkortostan, Russia. The population was 290 as of 2010. There are 3 streets.

Geography 
Begenyash is located 38 km northwest of Sterlitamak (the district's administrative centre) by road. Vladimirovka is the nearest rural locality.

References 

Rural localities in Sterlitamaksky District